Phengaris albida is a species of butterfly of the family Lycaenidae. It is only known from western China.

External links
Notes on and key to the genus Phengaris (s. str.) (Lepidoptera, Lycaenidae) from mainland China with description of a new species

Phengaris